"Rumble" is the second single from the album #4 Record by Australian rock band You Am I. It was released in 1998 and reached number 65 in that year's Hottest 100.

Track listing
 "Rumble" – 2:36
 "Arse-Kickin' Lady from the North-West" – 2:54
 "I Live Under the Flightpath" – 2:54

All songs by Tim Rogers

The B-sides are all You Am I originals. "Arse-Kickin' Lady from the North-West" is also the opening track from the live album, ...Saturday Night, 'Round Ten, and along with "I Live Under the Flight Path" reappeared as re-recorded acoustic versions on the Tim Rogers & The Twin Set album What Rhymes with Cars and Girls.

Charts

References

1998 singles
You Am I songs
1998 songs
Songs written by Tim Rogers (musician)